Richie Riley is an American college basketball coach and current head coach at the University of South Alabama.

Playing career
Riley played one collegiate season at Eastern Kentucky under Travis Ford. He graduated in 2005 from EKU.

Coaching career
Widely talked about as one of the highest regarded up-and-coming head coaches in Division 1 Men's Basketball, Richie Riley was recently ranked 16th on ESPN.com’s “40 Under 40” list and a finalist for the Ben Jobe Award, presented annually to the top NCAA Division I minority coach by CollegeInsider.com. Known as an elite program builder and high level recruiter, especially in the transfer portal, Richie Riley's South Alabama Jaguars have had a top rated recruiting class all three of his years. 

Riley joined Cliff Ellis's staff at Coastal Carolina for his first Division one assistant coaching job, spending three seasons there before a one-year stop as an assistant coach at his alma mater, Eastern Kentucky. He then had assistant stops at UAB and Clemson before accepting the head coaching position at Nicholls State becoming the 11th coach in program history, replacing J. P. Piper.

After two seasons with Nicholls State, Riley was named the 10th head coach in program history at South Alabama, replacing Matthew Graves.

After guiding the Jaguars to a 20-11 finish in 2019-20, he has an overall mark of 53-38 at the school and an overall mark of 88-66 in five season as a head coach.

Last season marked the first time the program has recorded 20 wins since the 2008-09 campaign, and it included the Jags posting an eight-game win streak to wrap up the regular season that was the team’s longest entering postseason play dating back to the winter of 1980.  USA finished 13-7 in the Sun Belt Conference, securing the second seed at the league tournament which was cancelled due to the coronavirus (COVID-19) pandemic before the Jaguars could play a game in the event.

Following the season, Josh Ajayi was a National Association of Basketball Coaches first-team all-district selection and was voted first-team all-Sun Belt Conference while Trhae Mitchell earned third-team all-league honors.  It was the first time the program had multiple individuals honored by the SBC in back-to-back years since 2008 and ‘09.  Ajayi and Chad Lott were first and second, respectively in the conference and among the top 40 nationally in field-goal percentage while Chad Fox was among the top 100 in the country in free-throw percentage and Mitchell ended up among the top 100 in blocked shots per game.

South finished the season 25th in the nation with a 47.1 field-goal percentage and was also among the top 100 in steals per game (58th), turnover margin (61st), and fewest turnovers (73rd).

It took just one season for Riley to turn the fortunes of the South Alabama men’s basketball program around as he led the Jaguars to its best record in five years and has them poised to become a force in the Sun Belt Conference.

The gains in year one were modest, but important. The Jags increased their win total by three to 17, which was their most since 2012-13, set a new school record for 3-pointers with 285, and had two players — Ajayi and Mitchell — named all-Sun Belt for the first time since 2009.

Ajayi and Mitchell paced a group of five players in double digits, a first for the program since 1996-97, led by Ajayi’s career-best 16.4 points per game. Ajayi, who led the Sun Belt in field-goal percentage and ranked in the league’s top in both scoring and rebounding, was voted to the second team, while Mitchell, the school’s second-ever player — and first since 1988-89 — to record 200 rebounds and 100 assists in the same season.

The offense, which posted a scoring average of 72.9, USA’s highest since 2007-08, was firing on all cylinders in December during a span that saw South Alabama go 6-2. Starting Dec. 8, the Jaguars recorded 79 points or more and posted a positive assist/turnover ratio in six straight outings, neither of which had been done since the end of the 1990-91 campaign. In addition, the Jags also shot 50 percent or better in five straight games during that span, which also had not been done since 1990-91.

A recruiting strategy based heavily on the transfer market has brought in highly-regarded players from California, Florida, Iowa State and South Carolina, and all-conference honorees from American, High Point, Howard and Western Michigan.

Riley was announced on March 8, 2018 as the 10th head coach in the history of the program after helping Nicholls to its first regular-season Southland Conference championship since 1998.

Riley was the head coach the previous two seasons at Nicholls, compiling a 35-28 overall record and a 22-14 mark in the Southland Conference. In his last season, he led the Colonels to the regular-season co-championship with a 15-3 record in league play and an overall mark of 21-11; it was the program’s first winning season since the 2008-09 campaign.

Nicholls led the conference in scoring with an average of 82.5 points per game, and was among the top three in the league in eight other statistical categories including second in field-goal percentage (47.2%), 3-point field goals per game (8.1), steals per game (9.6) and scoring margin (+7.2 ppg). Not only was the team among the top five in the country in total steals, steals per game and turnovers forced, it ranked among the top 25 nationally in scoring average and top 50 in field-goal percentage as well.

Under his guidance, Roddy Peters became the Colonels’ first first-team all-league selection since 2013 this season, with two other student-athletes earning all-Southland recognition during Riley’s two years at the helm of the program.

Peters, who was also the league’s newcomer of the year, joined fellow all-Southland honoree Tevon Saddler in the top six in the conference in scoring, with 19.7 and 15.8 points per game, respectively. Peters was second in scoring and sixth with 4.2 assists per contest, while Saddler, a second-team selection, was sixth in points and ninth with 6.6 rebounds per game.

The Colonels’ tenacity on defense led to three players listed in the conference’s top 11 in steals, including all-defensive team member Jahvaughn Powell, who led the SLC in steals per game (2.3), and Kevin Johnson, who ranked third (1.9).

The season before, the team went 7-11 in league play and 14-17 overall, but led the Southland in both blocks (6.1) and 3-pointers (9.0) per game. The Colonels were fourth in steals per game (7.5), but Powell was second individually (2.0), and Johnathan Bell ranked third (1.9).

Powell paced the SLC in assists per game (5.0) and Liam Thomas was the statistical champion in blocks (4.2).

Prior to taking over at Nicholls, he was an assistant for two seasons at Clemson. In his first season on the staff, he helped the Tigers to eight Atlantic Coast Conference wins — with one coming at NCAA Sweet 16 participant North Carolina State — as well as a pair of victories over NCAA Tournament teams from the SEC, including a top-25 Arkansas squad. The following year Clemson won 10 ACC games for only the fifth time in program history, while his efforts in recruiting helped the Tigers sign both ESPN 4-star top-100 prospect Ty Hudson and the No. 2 national junior-college prospect, Legend Robertin.

As an assistant at Alabama-Birmingham from 2012-14, Riley played a key role in the Blazers signing a top-25 recruiting class that would provide the core of a team that advanced to the third round of the 2015 NCAA Tournament; the group included three individuals who would go on to earn all-Conference USA honors as well as the league’s 6th Man-of-the-Year Award. His time at UAB was highlighted by a 63-59 victory over No. 16 North Carolina during the 2013-14 season.

Riley’s efforts with the Blazers led to his selection to attend the prestigious Villa 7 Conference for rising assistants.

In his lone season at Eastern Kentucky in 2011-12, he was part of a staff that led the Colonels to a 16-16 record. But his efforts in recruiting for the program played a part in signing a class that would help EKU advance to the NCAA Tournament in 2015; the group included Corey Walden, who would go on to twice be chosen the Ohio Valley Conference Defensive Player of the Year and the 2014 OVC Tournament Most Valuable Player in addition to being voted first-team all-league in ‘15.

Riley’s first experience at the NCAA Division I level came at Coastal Carolina, where he was an assistant on Cliff Ellis’ staff from 2009-11. In his two years with the program, the Chanticleers posted a 56-13 mark overall and 31-5 record in the Big South Conference, winning a pair of regular-season titles, advancing to the conference tournament championship game twice and making an appearance in the National Invitation Tournament each season.

After beginning his coaching career as an assistant at Georgetown (Ky.) from 2003-05, Riley also served as an assistant at Hawai’i-Pacific during the 2005-06 campaign before a three-season stint at Pikeville (Ky.) from 2006-09. While at PC he received the honor of ‘Top NAIA Assistant’ from RecruitingRumors.com.

Head coaching record

NCAA DI

References

1983 births
Living people
American men's basketball coaches
American men's basketball players
Basketball coaches from Kentucky
Basketball players from Kentucky
Clemson Tigers men's basketball coaches
Coastal Carolina Chanticleers men's basketball coaches
College men's basketball head coaches in the United States
Eastern Kentucky Colonels men's basketball coaches
Eastern Kentucky Colonels men's basketball players
Georgetown Tigers men's basketball coaches
Nicholls Colonels men's basketball coaches
People from London, Kentucky
South Alabama Jaguars men's basketball coaches
UAB Blazers men's basketball coaches